Australia competed at the 2013 Summer Universiade in Kazan, Russia from 6-17 July July 2013. 153 athletes are a part of the Australian.

Australia won 16 medals in total (15th place) including 6 gold medals (10th place).

References

Nations at the 2013 Summer Universiade
Australia at the Summer Universiade